The boys' mass start speed skating competition of the Innsbruck 2012 Winter Youth Olympics was held at Eisschnellaufbahn on 20 January 2012.

Results
The races were held at 11:23.

References

External links 
 olympedia.org
 

Speed skating at the 2012 Winter Youth Olympics